The 2012–13 Ryobi One Day Cup was the 43rd season of official List A domestic cricket in Australia. The competition had the same format as the previous season.

The 2012–13 competition was won by the Queensland Bulls. The final was reduced to 32 overs due to rain, with Queensland defeating Victoria by 2 runs. The win was Queensland's first since the 2008–09 season.

Table

Fixtures

September 2012

October 2012

November 2012

December 2012

January 2013

February 2013

Final

References

External links
 Cricket Australia Website
 Ryobi One Day Cup @ ESPNcricinfo

Ryobi One-Day Cup
Australian domestic limited-overs cricket tournament seasons
Ryobi